Derek Keenan (born October 2, 1961, in Oshawa, Ontario) is a former lacrosse player, and current head coach and general manager of the Saskatchewan Rush of the National Lacrosse League. Keenan has won the NLL GM of the Year award and the Les Bartley Award for Coach of the Year three times each; he won both awards in 2006, 2010, and 2014 though he shared the 2010 Bartley Award with Chris Hall.

After a long amateur career, (with the Oshawa Green Gaels and the Brooklin Redmen of the Ontario Junior and Senior Leagues respectively, and Ithaca College where he made All-American), and appearances with the Canadian National Field team at several world championships, Keenan began professional play in 1992 with the Buffalo Bandits, where he won the 1992 Rookie of the Year Award. The Bandits won the Champions Cup in both of Keenan's seasons with the team. After a five-year break, he played six games with the Toronto Rock in 1999, before becoming an assistant coach under Les Bartley. The Rock won the 1999 NLL Championship, and with Bartley at the helm and Keenan and Ed Comeau as assistant coaches, the Rock went to the championship game in each of the next four seasons, winning three times, in 2000, 2002, and 2003.

In November 2003, Bartley stepped down due to his battle with colon cancer, and Keenan was promoted to interim general manager, while Comeau was given the job of interim head coach. However, less than four months later, after a 2–4 start, both Keenan and Comeau were fired by the Rock, replaced by Terry Sanderson.

In 2005, Keenan was hired by the Anaheim Storm, becoming their head coach and general manager. He improved the Storm from a dismal 1–15 record in 2004 to a 5–11 record in 2005. However, the Storm folded after the 2005 season due to low attendance.

In July 2005, Keenan was named head coach and general manager of the then-unnamed Portland expansion franchise. The team was named the "LumberJax", and finished the 2006 season 11–5, becoming the first expansion team in NLL history to finish first in its division. Keenan was awarded both the GM of the Year Award and the Les Bartley Award for coach of the year.  As of November 2012 he was the coach of the Edmonton Rush of the National Lacrosse League.  He was inducted into the Canadian Lacrosse Hall of Fame in November, 2012

Keenan is the second cousin of NHL head coach Mike Keenan. Keenan's wife, Wendy, was the sister of Hockey Hall of Famer, Joe Nieuwendyk. Wendy died on Friday, January 2, 2015, at age 51.

Statistics

National Lacrosse League

References

Awards

1961 births
Living people
Buffalo Bandits players
Lacrosse people from Ontario
National Lacrosse League coaches
National Lacrosse League major award winners
Portland LumberJax
Sportspeople from Oshawa
Syracuse Orange men's lacrosse players
Toronto Rock players